The Apertura 2009 Liguilla Final is a two-legged football match-up to determine the Apertura 2009 champion.

Final rules 
Like other match-ups in the knockout round, the teams will play two games, one at each team's home stadium. As the highest seeded team determined at the beginning of the Liguilla, Irapuato was to have home-field advantage for the second leg. If the teams remained tied after 90 minutes of play during the 2nd leg, extra time will be used, followed by a penalty shootout if necessary.

Final summary

First leg

Second leg 

2009–10 Liga de Ascenso season